Sumika may refer to:

Sumika (given name), a feminine Japanese given name
Sumika (band), a Japanese rock band

People with the surname
Aya Sumika (born 1980), American actress